Ayatollah Gholamreza Hassani 21 July 1927 – 21 May 2018) was the previous Friday prayer, first First imam of Masjid-e-Jamé mosque of the city of Urmia in northwest Iran after Iranian Revolution., member of the Islamic Consultative Assembly in the first term from electoral district of Urmia and representative of the Iranian Supreme Leader Ali Khamenei in West Azarbaijan Province. He has been described as one of the most, if not the most, conservative voices in Iran and Shia Islam world. He is known for the highly challenging religious and political positions taken and his ultimate opposition to Caliphate and Anti-Sunni theories advocated in his controversial Friday sermons, which have reportedly drawn criticism from many of the Sunni leaders, Iranian reformists, Pan-Turkists, radical left organisations, Kurdish nationalists with adherence to Sunni tradition and Southern Azerbaijan patriot movement and been accused by "Iranian political satirists in their works." In the aftermath of the 1979 revolution in Iran, he led the militia Javanmardan and fought the Kurds. He was involved in massacre in the village Qarna. After a failed assassination attempt on him in 1981 he was flown to Ireland for treatment. Hassani's devotion to the Islamic Revolution was such that in 1983, several years after the Revolution, he informed authorities of the hiding place of his son, Rashid, a member of the opposition leftist guerilla group Fadayian Khalq, who was then executed by firing squad with Hassani's approval. Hassani is quoted as telling an American journalist, "Abraham didn't sacrifice his son, but I did. Even today, I don't regret it."

In 2001, articles appeared in the English-language media about a Friday sermon he delivered that condemned the practice of owning and holding small dogs as unIslamic. The New York Times reported him as saying, "I would like to thank the honorable police and judges and all those who worked to arrest dog lovers and to confiscate short-legged dogs in this city," Several years later a crackdown on dogs and dog owners was launched in Tehran. He has also been quoted as saying that "Women who do not respect the hijab and their husbands deserve to die ... These women and their husbands and their fathers must die."

In 2011 he was reportedly presented with the national "Medal of Bravery", "one of the most significant official medals awarded in Iran," by president Mahmoud Ahmadinejad.  The medal was reportedly awarded for his record of resistance against the Shah's regime prior to the Islamic Revolution, against the Kurdish opposition in the first years of the Islamic Republic, and for his participation in the Iraq-Iran War. In February 2014 he was dismissed from his post as a representative of Ali Khamenei.

As of January 2014, Hassani had two living wives. He has seven sons and four daughters. Hassani died on 21 May 2018 at the age of 90.

Hassani's children have become known figures in various fields with contrasting political leanings, most recently his granddaughter Ana Diamond has been recognized for her human rights activism in the United Kingdom following her false trial, imprisonment, and acquittal in Iran.

References

1927 births
2018 deaths
People from Urmia
Deputies of Urmia
Members of the 1st Islamic Consultative Assembly
Representatives of the Supreme Leader in the Provinces of Iran
Recipients of the Order of Courage (Iran)